Theilheim is a municipality in the district of Würzburg in Bavaria in Germany.

References

Würzburg (district)